Moraea flaccida commonly known as the one-leaf Cape tulip, is a bulb native to South Africa, including in Fynbos habitats.

It has become a noxious weed in farmland in southern Australia, including parts of Western Australia, Victoria and South Australia.

References

flaccida
Endemic flora of South Africa
Flora of the Cape Provinces
Fynbos
Plants described in 1841